Moctar Sidi El Hacen El Ide (Arabic: مختار سيدي الحسن; born 31 December 1997), commonly known as Hacen, is a Mauritanian professional footballer who plays as a central midfielder for Spanish club CD Lugo.

Club career
Born in Arafat in the outskirts of Nouakchott, Hacen started off at local ASAC Concorde and nearly moved to Valencia CF in August 2014 after impressing in the year's L'Alcúdia International Football Tournament, but chose to join Levante UD instead. However, he was unable to play any official matches until his 18th birthday.

Assigned to the club's Juvenil squad, Hacen made his debut with the reserves on 14 January 2016, coming on as a first half substitute in a 1–3 Segunda División B away loss against CD Llosetense. He was definitely promoted to the B-side ahead of the 2016–17 campaign, and scored his first senior goal on 6 November to open a 2–0 home win over UE Llagostera.

Hacen made his first team debut on 28 November 2017, starting in a 1–1 home draw against Girona FC, for the season's Copa del Rey. His La Liga debut occurred three days later, replacing Samu García in a 0–0 away draw against Málaga CF.

On 24 July 2018, Hacen signed a two-year deal with another reserve team, Real Valladolid B also in the third division. He made one two-minute substitute appearance for the first team in the top flight the following 23 April, a 1–0 win over Girona FC at the Estadio José Zorrilla.

On 31 January 2020, Hacen was loaned to Segunda División side CD Lugo for the remainder of the campaign. He scored his first professional goal on 16 February, netting the game's only in an away success over CF Fuenlabrada.

On 2 October 2020, Hacen rejoined Lugo on loan for the 2020–21 campaign. Upon returning, he suffered a knee injury in July 2021 while on international duty, and later terminated his contract with Valladolid the following 30 January.

On 26 August 2022, after roughly one year of inactivity and six months without a club, Hacen returned to Lugo on a permanent one-year contract.

International career
Hacen started very early with his international career, having played seven games with the senior national team before the age of 16; his first being on 2 March 2013 by starting in a 0–0 away friendly draw against the Gambia. On 5 January 2014, he scored his first ever senior international goal in a 3–2 friendly win against Mozambique. On 10 January 2014, he was named in Mauritania's 23-man squad for the 2014 African Nations Championship.

Later in 2016, he was part of the Mauritania U20s who participated in the 2016 COTIF Tournament. He also participated in the 2017 Africa U-20 Cup of Nations qualification, where he helped Mauritania reach the second round after defeating Algeria 3–2 on aggregate, scoring two goals in the process.

On 21 May 2019, he was named in Mauritania's 23-man squad for the 2019 Africa Cup of Nations in Egypt. On 24 June 2019, he scored from the penalty spot in his sides 4–1 opening match defeat against Mali, thus scoring Mauritania's first ever goal in the tournament.

Career statistics

Club

International

International goals
Scores and results list Mauritania's goal tally first.

References

External links

El Hacen El Ide at maurifoot.net

1997 births
Living people
People from Nouakchott-Sud Region
Mauritanian footballers
Association football midfielders
La Liga players
Segunda División players
Segunda División B players
Tercera División players
Atlético Levante UD players
Levante UD footballers
Real Valladolid Promesas players
Real Valladolid players
CD Lugo players
Mauritania international footballers
Mauritanian expatriate footballers
Expatriate footballers in Spain
Mauritanian expatriate sportspeople in Spain
2019 Africa Cup of Nations players
2014 African Nations Championship players